William Gaxton (né Arthur Anthony Gaxiola, December 2, 1889 – February 2, 1963) was an American star of vaudeville, film, and theatre. Gaxton was president of The Lambs Club from 1936 to 1939, 1952 to 1953, and 1957 to 1961. He and Victor Moore became a popular theatre team in the 1930s and 1940s; they also appeared in a film together.

Biography
Gaxton was born Arthur Anthony Gaxiola. He was of Spanish ancestry and a cousin of actor Leo Carrillo. He attended Boone Military Academy, Lowell High School, Santa Clara College, and the University of California.

Gaxton appeared on film and onstage. He debuted on Broadway in the Music Box Revue on October 23, 1922.

On radio Gaxton starred in Broadway Showtime, a 30-minute musical drama that ran on CBS from December 27, 1943, to June 26, 1944.

In 1961 and 1962, he and Arthur Treacher starred in Guy Lombardo's production of the musical Paradise Island at Jones Beach Marine Theater.

He died from cancer on February 2, 1963, in Manhattan. He was survived by his wife, Madeline, who was part of the Cameron Sisters dance team.

Filmography
Gaxton starred in the film version of Fifty Million Frenchmen (1931), as well as The Silent Partner (1931), Their Big Moment (1934), Best Foot Forward (1943), The Heat's On (1943), and Diamond Horseshoe (1945).

Broadway

He debuted on Broadway in the Music Box Revue on October 23, 1922, and later starred in Rodgers and Hart's A Connecticut Yankee (1927), singing "Thou Swell"; Cole Porter's Fifty Million Frenchmen (1929), singing "You Do Something to Me"; Of Thee I Sing (1931) with Victor Moore; Cole Porter's Anything Goes (1934), with Ethel Merman and Victor Moore; White Horse Inn (1936); Leave It to Me! (1938) with Victor Moore; Louisiana Purchase (1940); and Hollywood Pinafore (1945).

References

External links

William Gaxton papers, circa 1937-1961, held by the Billy Rose Theatre Division, New York Public Library for the Performing Arts

1893 births
1963 deaths
Male actors from California
American male film actors
American male musical theatre actors
Male actors from San Francisco
American people of Spanish descent
Vaudeville performers
20th-century American male actors
The Lambs presidents
20th-century American singers
20th-century American male singers